St. Anne's Episcopal Church is a historic church at 29 Church Street in Calais, Maine.  Built in 1853, it is a locally distinctive example of Carpenter Gothic architecture, and is the only known statewide work of architect James Renwick, Jr.  The church building was listed on the National Register of Historic Places in 1982.  It is a member of the Episcopal Diocese of Maine; its pastor is the Rev. Sara Gavit.

Description and history
St. Anne's is located in central Calais, at the northern corner of Church and Washington Streets.  It is a single-story wood-frame structure, with a gable roof, board-and-batten siding, and a granite foundation.  Its front facade, facing Church Street, has a buttressed four-stage tower to the right of the gable, and a smaller two-stage tower with open belfry on the left.  The right tower houses the main entrance on the first level, a narrow lancet window on the second, the main belfry with louvered lancet openings on the third, and a large clock on the fourth; it is topped by a low jigsawn balustrade with corner pinnacles.  The main gable, which has a stepped front, has a four-part stained-glass window with tracery at its center.

The church was built in 1853 to a design by James Renwick, Jr.  Best known for St. Patrick's Cathedral, New York (built 1858–73), Renwick was in 1853 overseeing construction of the Smithsonian Institution Building.  This church is his only known Maine commission.

See also

National Register of Historic Places listings in Washington County, Maine
St. Anne's Episcopal Church (disambiguation)

References

External links
Parish Website for St. Anne's Calais
 Historic Sites Inventory for Calais

Churches on the National Register of Historic Places in Maine
Carpenter Gothic church buildings in Maine
Episcopal church buildings in Maine
Churches in Washington County, Maine
Churches completed in 1853
19th-century Episcopal church buildings
Buildings and structures in Calais, Maine
National Register of Historic Places in Washington County, Maine